Trieste-Opicina (1911–1971) is a hillclimb up the Opicina hill in Trieste, northeastern Italy. Also known as Albo d'Oro automobilistico. The race was suspended twice, around First and Second World War. After a serious crash of Austrian Herbert Jerich in a Ford Escort TC and subsequent safety concerns the race was cancelled after its 1971 edition. From 2017, the historic race was recreated as a tour on closed roads around Trieste.


Winners

The Trieste–Opicina motorcycle race (1920–1958) 
Officially titled  “Trieste – Poggioreale”, it is more known as “Trieste–Opicina”, arranged by the Moto Club Trieste.

References

Literature 
 

Auto races in Italy
Sport in Trieste